Schizophoria is an extinct genus of brachiopod belonging to the superfamily Enteletoidea. Specimens have been found in Devonian through Permian beds in North America, Australia, central and southeast Asia, and eastern Europe.

Species 
S. amanaensis Stainbrook, 1945
S. annanaensis Stainbrook, 1945
S. oklahomae 
S. chouteauensis Weller, 1914
S. depressa Easton, 1962
S. kintaensis Shi and Waterhouse, 1991
S. kutsingensis Grabau, 1932
S. lata Stainbrook, 1940
S. nevadaensis Merriam 1940
S. paraprima Johnson et al., 1973
S. parenteletiformis Huang, 1933
S. resupinata Martin, 1809
S. rhomboidalis Huang, 1933
S. striatula von Schlotheim, 1813
S. swallovi Weller, 1914
S. tani Huang, 1933
S. upensis Sarycheva and Sokolskaja, 1952
S. verulamensis Cvancara, 1958
S. vulvaria von Schlotheim, 1820

References 

Paleozoic animals
Rhynchonellata
Prehistoric brachiopod genera